John Joseph "Dookie" McKenzie (10 November 1881 – 21 March 1946) was an Australian rules footballer who played with Essendon and Melbourne in the Victorian Football League (VFL).

He gained the nickname "Dookie" from his favourite player as a youth, Alex "Dookie" McKenzie, a Carlton and Melbourne player of the 1880s, and 1890s.<ref>Alex McKenzie, Demonwiki; [http://www.blueseum.org/Alex+%22Dookie%22+McKenzie Alex "Dookie" McKenzie, "Blueseum.]</ref>

Family
The son of John McKenzie, and Johanna McKenzie, née Scott, John Joseph McKenzie was born in Fitzroy North, Victoria on 10 November 1881.

He married twice.

His first wife, Mary Ellen McCann (1886-1918) died in July 1918. Their son, John James McKenzie (1908-), played for Essendon in 1929.

McKenzie fell on hard times in 1918 when his wife died, leaving him without work and with six children to look after. A fund was set up by the VFL to give him financial support, with many clubs donating money."Dookie" McKenzie, The (Perth) Daily News, (Thursday, 5 September 1918), p.2.

He married his second wife, Winifred Zipporah Griffiths (1884-1969), née Simmons, in 1922.

Football
McKenzie played for Fitroy Juniors for half a season before going to Brunswick in the Victorian Football Association (VFA).

He joined Essendon in 1901, winning a premiership in his first season. He played for Essendon in 1901 and 1902. He then moved to Western Australia and spent a year playing in the Western Australian Goldfields Football Association with the White Feather Football Club.

In 1904 he returned to Essendon and by 1906 he was the captain. For his efforts during the 1906 season he was Essendon's best and fairest winner in his last season for the Bombers. He finished his career with Essendon having played 81 games and kicking 90 goals playing as a ruckman.

In 1907 season he became captain-coach of Essendon Association in the VFA before taking on the same role at his original club Brunswick from 1908 to 1914. He led the Brunswick to a premiership in his second season, 1909. During the last month or so of that season, The Argus newspaper conducted a public vote on which players were considered a champion in both the VFL and the VFA. McKenzie won the Association poll with a tally of near 18,000 votes, a figure which outstripped that of the League winner Bill Busbridge. As captain, McKenzie was offered £150 to throw the 1911 Grand Final against Essendon Association; McKenzie refused and immediately reported the offer to the Association.

He returned to the VFL for just one season in 1915, playing this time with Melbourne. As captain-coach he helped them reach the finals for the first time in fifteen years, becoming one of a select few players to captain two different clubs in finals.

Hawthorn (VFA)
Hawthorn returned to the VFA in 1919 — having not played in 1916, 1917, and 1918 due to World War I — and McKenzie was appointed as coach for the 1919 season.

Death
He died on 21 March 1946.Jack McKenzie Fine Sportsman, The Sporting Globe, (Saturday, 23 March 1946), p.3; Death of "Dookie" McKenzie, The Herald, (Friday, 22 March 1946), p.16; Football: Mr. J.J. McKenzie's Death, The Age, (Saturday, 23 March 1946), p.4.

Footnotes

References
 Holmesby, Russell and Main, Jim (2007). The Encyclopedia of AFL Footballers. 7th ed. Melbourne: Bas Publishing.
 Maplestone, M., Flying Higher: History of the Essendon Football Club 1872–1996, Essendon Football Club, (Melbourne), 1996. 
 Ross, J. (ed), 100 Years of Australian Football 1897–1996: The Complete Story of the AFL, All the Big Stories, All the Great Pictures, All the Champions, Every AFL Season Reported'', Viking, (Ringwood), 1996.

External links

 
 
 Jack McKenzie, Demonwiki.
 Jack "Dookie" McKenzie, ''The VFA Project
 Jack McKenzie, Boyles Football Photos.
 Past Payer Profile: Jack J. McKenzie, "essendonfc.com.au".

1881 births
1946 deaths
Australian rules footballers from Melbourne
Australian Rules footballers: place kick exponents
Essendon Football Club players
Essendon Football Club Premiership players
Melbourne Football Club players
Melbourne Football Club coaches
Crichton Medal winners
Brunswick Football Club players
Brunswick Football Club coaches
Essendon Association Football Club players
White Feather Football Club players
Melbourne Football Club captains
Hawthorn Football Club (VFA) coaches
19th-century Australian people
20th-century Australian people
One-time VFL/AFL Premiership players
People from Fitzroy, Victoria